Raccoon Creek is a  stream that drains parts of five Ohio counties in the United States. It originates in Hocking County, Ohio. It flows through Vinton County and Gallia County and a corner of Meigs County. Its largest tributary, Little Raccoon Creek, arises in Jackson County. The watershed also includes part of Athens County, drained by another tributary, Hewett Fork. The other major tributaries are Elk Fork, located entirely in Vinton County, and Brushy Fork, which is mostly in Vinton County with a small area in Hocking County.

Location
Mouth: Confluence with the Ohio River in Gallia County at 
Origin: Confluence of the East and West Branches of Raccoon Creek  near New Plymouth in Vinton County at

Discharge
The USGS stream gauge on Raccoon Creek at Adamsville recorded a mean annual discharge of  during water years 1916-2019. The gauge on Little Raccoon Creek at Ewington recorded a mean annual discharge of  during water years 1999-2019.

Organizations
The Raccoon Creek Partnership was established to deal with environmental and recreational issues pertaining to Raccoon Creek.

See also
List of rivers of Ohio

References

Rivers of Vinton County, Ohio
Rivers of Hocking County, Ohio
Rivers of Gallia County, Ohio
Rivers of Jackson County, Ohio
Rivers of Meigs County, Ohio
Rivers of Ohio